Justice Chabalala (born 16 November 1991) is a South African soccer player who plays as a defender for Chippa United.

Career
Having been promoted to their first team in October 2015, he made 18 league appearances for Free State Stars across the 2015–16 season.

He signed for Orlando Pirates in July 2016 on a three-year contract.

In January 2017, he joined Chippa United on loan until the end of the season. He appeared in fourteen league matches for the club.

He joined Bloemfontein Celtic on loan in January 2020. In September 2020, his loan was extended to the end of the 2020–21 season.

Personal life
Chabalala was born in Giyani. He is the cousin of fellow footballer Tonic Chabalala.

References

1991 births
Living people
People from Greater Giyani Local Municipality
Soccer players from Limpopo
South African soccer players
Association football defenders
Free State Stars F.C. players
Orlando Pirates F.C. players
Chippa United F.C. players
Bloemfontein Celtic F.C. players
Sekhukhune United F.C. players
South African Premier Division players